John Coupland Hospital is a healthcare facility in Ropery Road, Gainsborough, Lincolnshire, England. It is managed by Lincolnshire Community Health Services.

History
The facility, which was founded by George Coupland in memory of his father John Coupland, was built in the Georgian style and opened on 24 September 1913. It treated British and Belgian military casualties during the First World War. It joined the National Health Service in 1948 and a major programme of fire protection works was carried out at the hospital in December 2017.

References

External links
Official site

Hospital buildings completed in 1913
Hospitals in Lincolnshire
Hospitals established in 1913
1913 establishments in England
Gainsborough, Lincolnshire
NHS hospitals in England